Odotoncarus is a genus of ground beetles in the family Carabidae. There are seven described species in Odotoncarus.

Species
These seven species belong to the genus Odotoncarus:
 Odotoncarus asiaticus (Chaudoir, 1852)  (Mediterranean and the Middle East)
 Odotoncarus cephalotes (Dejean, 1826)  (Morocco, Portugal, and Spain)
 Odotoncarus parilis (Dvorak, 1993)  (Syria)
 Odotoncarus robustus (Dejean, 1830)  (Albania and Greece)
 Odotoncarus samson (Reiche & Saulcy, 1855)  (Middle East)
 Odotoncarus silvestrii (Gridelli, 1930)  (Libya)
 Odotoncarus zarudnianus (Semenov & Znojko, 1929)  (Iran)

References

Harpalinae